Gibraltar competed in the 2014 Commonwealth Games in Glasgow, Scotland from 23 July to 3 August 2014.

Athletics

Men
Track & road events

Women
Track & road events

Key
Note–Ranks given for track events are within the athlete's heat only
Q = Qualified for the next round
q = Qualified for the next round as a fastest loser or, in field events, by position without achieving the qualifying target
NR = National record
N/A = Round not applicable for the event

Cycling

Road
Men

Shooting

Men

Women

Squash

Individual

Doubles

Swimming

Men

Women

Triathlon

Individual

References

Nations at the 2014 Commonwealth Games
Gibraltar at the Commonwealth Games
2014 in Gibraltarian sport